United Nations Messenger of Peace is a special post-nominal honorific title of authority bestowed by the United Nations to "distinguished individuals, carefully selected from the fields of art, music, literature and sports, who have agreed to help focus worldwide attention on the work of the United Nations." Globally, present and past messengers of peace are the only public figures that are or may be legally and diplomatically known as a "United Nations Goodwill Ambassador". Other United Nations goodwill ambassador programmes in the UN system participants assign their title of authority (commission) using the agency name or patent program acronym or abbreviation such as: UN Women Goodwill Ambassador; UNICEF Goodwill Ambassador; UNESCO Goodwill Ambassador; UNAIDS Goodwill Ambassador; and other legal designations following their name.

The messengers are initially chosen to serve for a period of three years; however, all of the current thirteen messengers have served for more than five years, some of them as long as 15 or 20 years. The Messengers of Peace idea was started in 1997 as a central addition to the system of UN goodwill ambassadors and cause advocates, which has been operated by the different UN agencies since 1954, when UNICEF appointed Danny Kaye as its first goodwill ambassador.

Whilst the ambassadors and advocates mainly promote the work of the UN specialized agency or division they were appointed by, a Messenger of Peace is intended to promote the work of the United Nations in general and is commissioned directly by the Secretary-General of the United Nations most often with a formal ceremony.

Current messengers
 Michael Douglas - designated 1998
 Jane Goodall - designated 2002
 Yo-Yo Ma - designated 2006
 Princess Haya Bint Al Hussein - designated 2007
 Daniel Barenboim - designated 2007
 Paulo Coelho - designated 2007
 Midori Goto - designated 2007
 Charlize Theron - designated 2008
 Stevie Wonder - designated 2009
 Edward Norton - designated 2010
 Lang Lang - designated 2013
 Leonardo DiCaprio - designated 2014
 Malala Yousafzai - designated 2017

Former Messengers
 Enrico Macias - designated 1997
 Muhammad Ali - designated 1998
 Anna Cataldi - designated 1998
 Luciano Pavarotti - designated 1998
 Elie Wiesel - designated 1998
 Vijay Amritraj - designated 2001
 Wynton Marsalis - designated 2001
 George Clooney - designated 2008
 Wangari Maathai - designated 2009

See also
 Goodwill Ambassador
 FAO Goodwill Ambassador
 UNDP Goodwill Ambassador
 UNHCR Goodwill Ambassador
 UNESCO Goodwill Ambassador
 UNODC Goodwill Ambassador
 UNFPA Goodwill Ambassador
 UN Women Goodwill Ambassador
 UNIDO Goodwill Ambassador
 UNICEF Goodwill Ambassador
 WHO Goodwill Ambassador
 United Nations Messengers of Peace

References

External links
United Nations Messengers of Peace
United Nations Former Messengers of Peace

 
Goodwill ambassador programmes